Farquharia is a genus of flowering plants in the family Apocynaceae, first described as a genus in 1912. It contains only one recognized species, Farquharia elliptica, native to tropical western and central Africa (Ghana, Ivory Coast, Nigeria, Cameroon, Gabon, Republic of Congo and Democratic Republic of the Congo).

Formerly included
Farquharia excelsa (Bojer) Hils. & Bojer. = Crateva excelsa Bojer

References

Flora of Africa
Monotypic Apocynaceae genera
Nerieae